California's 49th congressional district is a congressional district in the U.S. state of California.  The district is represented by Mike Levin.

The district currently covers the northern coastal areas of San Diego County, including Oceanside, Vista, Carlsbad, and Encinitas, as well as a portion of southern Orange County, including San Clemente, Dana Point, San Juan Capistrano, Ladera Ranch, and Coto de Caza.  Marine Corps Base Camp Pendleton is in the district.

In the 2016 election, Darrell Issa won by a margin of less than 1%. In the 2018 election, this district was considered to be a major battleground. Rep. Issa announced that he would not seek reelection. Following the November 6, 2018 election, Democrat Mike Levin became the district's congressman.

Competitiveness

In statewide races

Composition

As of the 2020 redistricting, California's 49th congressional district is located in Southern California. It covers the North County region of San Diego County, and south east Orange County.

San Diego County is split between this district, the 48th district and the 50th district. They are partitioned by Gavilan Mountain Rd, Sandia Creek Dr, De Luz Rd, Marine Corps Base Pendleton, Sleeping Indian Rd, Tumbleweed Ln, Del Valle Dr, Highland Oak St, Olive Hill Rd, Via Puerta del Sol, N River Rd, Highway 76, Old River Rd, Little Gopher Canyon Rd, Camino Cantera, Corre Camino, Tierra del Cielo, Elevado Rd, Vista Grande Dr, Warmlands Ave, Queens Way, Canciones del Cielo, Camino Loma Verde, Alessandro Trail, Friendly Dr, Edgehill Rd, Catalina Heights Way, Deeb Ct, Foothill Dr, Clarence Dr, Highway S14, Smilax Rd, Poinsetta Ave, W San Marcos Blvd, Diamond Trail Preserve, S Rancho Santa Rd, San Elijo Rd, Rancho Summitt Dr, Escondido Creek, El Camino del Norte, San Elijo Lagoon, Highland Dr, Avacado Pl, Jimmy Durante Blvd, San Dieguito Dr, 8th St, Nob Ave, Highway S21, and the San Diego Northern Railway. The 49th district takes in the cities of Carlsbad, Oceanside, Encinitas, Solana Beach, Del Mar, and Vista.

Orange County is split between this district, the 40th district, and the 47th district. They are partitioned by Alicia Parkway, Pacific Park Dr, San Joaquin Hills Trans Corridor, Cabot Rd, San Diego Freeway, Via Escolar, Arroyo Trabuco Creek, Oso Parkway, Thomas F Riley Wilderness Park, and Ronald W Casper’s Wilderness Park, Aliso & Wood Canyons, Vista del Sol, Highway 1, Stonington Rd, Virginia Way, 7th Ave, and Laguna Beach. The 49th district takes in the cities of San Clemente, San Juan Capistrano, Dana Point, and Laguna Nigel, as well as the census-designated place Ladera Ranch.

Cities & CDP with 10,000 or more people
 Oceanside - 175,742
 Carlsbad - 114,746
 Vista - 101,638
 Laguna Nigel - 64,355
 San Clemente - 64,293
 Encinitas - 62,709
 San Juan Capistrano - 35,911
 Dana Point - 33,107
 Ladera Ranch - 26,170
 Solana Beach - 12,941

2,500-10,000 people
 Del Mar - 3,954

List of members representing the district

Election results

1992

1994

1996

1998

2000

2002

2004

2006

2008

2010

2012

2014

2016

2018

2020

2022

Historical district boundaries
Before the 2002 redistricting, most of the territory currently located in the district was previously located in the 48th district.  The 49th district was located farther south, encompassing most of what is now the 53rd district.

Before the 2012 redistricting the district extended further inland to include a portion of southern Riverside County and most of northern San Diego County.

See also

List of United States congressional districts

References

External links
District information at GovTrack.us

49
Government of San Diego County, California
Government in Orange County, California
Carlsbad, California
Dana Point, California
Del Mar, California
La Jolla, San Diego
Mission Viejo, California
Oceanside, California
San Juan Capistrano, California
Solana Beach, California
Vista, California
Constituencies established in 1993
1993 establishments in California